Abolfazl Bazargan is an Iranian political activist and a senior member of the Freedom Movement of Iran.

He registered to run in the 1996 parliamentary election. Bazargan unsuccessfully stood as a candidate for a City Council of Tehran seat in 2003 election.

References

Living people
Freedom Movement of Iran politicians
Politicians from Tehran
Year of birth missing (living people)